The dark-throated oriole (Oriolus xanthonotus) is a species of bird in the family Oriolidae.

It is found in Southeast Asia through Borneo and the Philippines. Its natural habitat is subtropical or tropical moist lowland forests where it is threatened by habitat loss.

Taxonomy and systematics
The dark-throated oriole is sometimes considered to form a superspecies with the Philippine oriole and the Isabela oriole. Alternate names for the dark-throated oriole include the black-headed oriole, black-throated oriole and Malaysian oriole. The alternate name 'black-headed oriole' should not be confused with the species of the same name, Oriolus larvatus.

Subspecies
Four subspecies are recognized: 
 O. x. xanthonotus - Horsfield, 1821: Found on the Malay Peninsula, Sumatra, Java and south-western Borneo
 Mentawai dark-throated oriole (O. x. mentawi) - Chasen & Kloss, 1926: Found on the Mentawai Islands archipelago off the west coast of Sumatra, in Indonesia.
 O. x. consobrinus - Ramsay, RGW, 1880: Originally described as a separate species. Found on Borneo and offlying islets
 O. x. persuasus - Bangs, 1922: Found in south-western Philippines

References

dark-throated oriole
Birds of Malesia
Near threatened animals
Near threatened biota of Asia
dark-throated oriole
Taxonomy articles created by Polbot
Birds of Sumatra